The Beattie Ministry was a Ministry of the Government of Queensland, led by Labor Premier Peter Beattie. It commenced on 26 June 1998, thirteen days after the Borbidge Ministry, led by Premier Rob Borbidge of the National Party, was defeated at the 1998 election. It was followed by the Bligh Ministry upon Beattie's retirement as Premier on 13 September 2007.

Overview
The election produced an unusual result—Labor did not gain any net seats in the Legislative Assembly of Queensland, maintaining 44 of 89, or one short of a governing majority, but the National-Liberal coalition which had governed with the support of Independent Liz Cunningham was reduced from 44 to 32 due mainly to the rise of Pauline Hanson's One Nation Party in their rural heartland. After negotiations between the Labor Party, Cunningham and a new independent, Peter Wellington, the latter announced on 25 June 1998 that he would support a minority Labor government on votes of confidence in return for specific commitments on accountability. The following day, Labor leader Peter Beattie and his deputy, Jim Elder, were sworn in by the Governor of Queensland as a two-man cabinet. Three days later, on 29 June 1998, they resigned so that a full ministry chosen by Caucus could be sworn in.

First Ministry
On 29 June 1998, a full ministry of 18 cabinet ministers and 4 parliamentary secretaries was sworn in. It served until the reconstitution of the Ministry on 22 February 2001 following the 2001 election.

The list below is ordered by decreasing seniority within the Cabinet, as indicated by the Government Gazette and the Hansard index.

Notes:
 On 1 August 1999, David Hamill was required to stand aside as Treasurer while investigations by the Auditor-General and the Criminal Justice Commission into the awarding of an Internet gaming licence was in process. Premier Peter Beattie served as Acting Treasurer and brought down a budget on 14 September. On 30 September, both inquiries cleared Hamill of any wrongdoing and he was reinstated.
 On 14 December 1999, Bob Gibbs resigned from Parliament to accept a role as trade commissioner to Los Angeles. Terry Mackenroth assumed his Sport portfolio (losing Rural Communities to Henry Palaszczuk), with Tourism and Racing going to junior minister Merri Rose. Parliamentary secretary to the Deputy Premier, Stephen Robertson, was appointed as a minister and took on Rose's former role of Emergency Services.
 On 22 November 1999, Deputy Premier Jim Elder, who was Acting Premier at the time due to the Premier being overseas, resigned following allegations that he was under suspicion for having illegally signed electoral forms for family members in his own seat. His portfolios were assumed for four days by Paul Braddy, then for another four by Premier Peter Beattie, before a minor reshuffle on 30 November 2000 which saw, among other things, Terry Mackenroth's promotion to Deputy Premier and Nita Cunningham's appointment to the Ministry.

Second Ministry
On 22 February 2001, following the 2001 election, a ministry of 19 cabinet ministers and 5 parliamentary secretaries was sworn in. It served until the reconstitution of the Ministry on 12 February 2004 following the 2004 election.

Third Ministry
On 12 February 2004, following the 2004 election, a ministry of 19 cabinet ministers and 6 parliamentary secretaries was sworn in. It served until the reconstitution of the Ministry on 28 July 2005 following the resignation of Deputy Premier Terry Mackenroth.

On 3 March 2005, Liddy Clark resigned after an investigation to the Crime and Misconduct Commission into airfares given to Aboriginal activists to Palm Island following a riot there. Her position in the ministry was not filled, with her portfolio going to John Mickel.

Fourth Ministry
On 28 July 2005, following the resignation of Deputy Premier Terry Mackenroth from the ministry and from Parliament, a ministry of 19 cabinet ministers and 6 parliamentary secretaries was sworn in. It served until the reconstitution of the Ministry on 23 September 2006 following the 2006 election.

Following a Crime and Misconduct Commission report on 7 December 2005, Gordon Nuttall resigned as a minister. Tim Mulherin was appointed in his place on 12 December.

Fifth Ministry
On 13 September 2006, following the 2006 election, a ministry of 19 cabinet ministers and 11 parliamentary secretaries was sworn in. It served until the end of the Ministry on 13 September 2007 following Anna Bligh's ascension to the post of Premier, and was followed by the Bligh Ministry.

Linda Lavarch, the Attorney-General, resigned from the Ministry on 18 October 2006 citing depression. Kerry Shine and Margaret Keech assumed her portfolios on 1 November 2006. Craig Wallace was appointed to the available place within the Ministry.

References
 All information about ministries was sourced from Ministries from December 1989, extracted from the Queensland Parliamentary Handbook.
 All information about events was sourced from the "Australian Political Chronicle" in various instalments of the Australian Journal of Politics and History.

Queensland ministries
Australian Labor Party ministries in Queensland